FNPT can refer to: 

 Flight & Navigation Procedures Trainer
 Female National Pipe Thread